Hasanpur is a small village of union council Malikpur, District Mansehra, situated between the villages of Sherpur and Malikpur in Khyber Pakhtunkhwa province, Pakistan. Khuwajgan Bazaar is a popular market near Sherpur, where all necessary things are available.

References 

Populated places in Mansehra District